Dortmund-Lütgendortmund Nord station is a railway station in the northern part of the Lütgendortmund district of the town of Dortmund, located in North Rhine-Westphalia, Germany.

Rail services

References

Railway stations in Dortmund